The 2016 Colorado House of Representatives election was held on Tuesday, November 8, 2016, with the primary election being held on June 28, 2016. Voters in the 65 districts of the Colorado House of Representatives elected their representatives. The elections coincided with the elections for other offices, including for U.S. President and the state senate.

Summary of Results

Closest races 
Seats where the margin of victory was under 10%:
  gain
 
 
   
  gain
  gain

Detailed Results

District 1

District 2

District 3

District 4

District 5

District 6

District 7

District 8

District 9

District 10

District 11

District 12

District 13

District 14

District 15

District 16

District 17

District 18

District 19

District 20

District 21

District 22

District 23

District 24

District 25

District 26

District 27

District 28

District 29

District 30

District 31

District 32

District 33

District 34

District 35

District 36

District 37

District 38

District 39

District 40

District 41

District 42

District 43

District 44

District 45

District 46

District 47

District 48

District 49

District 50

District 51

District 52

District 53

District 54

District 55

District 56

District 57

District 58

District 59

District 60

District 61

District 62

District 63

District 64

District 65

References

House of Representatives
Colorado House of Representatives elections
Colorado House of Representatives